Nasr-e Basir ("Clear Victory") is an Iranian Indigenous Smart Low-observable anti-ship cruise missile unveiled on 24 August 2014 in a defense exhibition in Tehran along with Ghadir missile, Karrar-4 MALE UAV and Mohajer-4 UAV.

References

See also
 Noor
 Khalij Fars
 Hormoz-2

Weapons and ammunition introduced in 2014
Anti-ship cruise missiles
Anti-ship missiles of Iran
Cruise missiles of Iran
Anti-ship missiles
Cruise missiles
Guided missiles of Iran
Anti-ship cruise missiles of Iran